Betta breviobesa is a species of gourami. It is native to Asia, where it occurs in the upper Kapuas River basin in West Kalimantan on the island of Borneo in Indonesia. The species reaches  in standard length and is known to be a facultative air-breather. It was described in 1998 by Heok Hui Tan and Maurice Kottelat alongside the species Betta pinguis, which also occurs in the Kapuas basin.

References 

breviobesa
Fish of Indonesia
Fish described in 1998